Dorian Rogozenko (also spelled Rogozenco; born 18 August 1973) is a Romanian chess grandmaster (2002) and champion of Moldova in 1994.

He took part in the FIDE World Chess Championship 2002, but was knocked out in the first round by Mikhail Gurevich. He played for Moldova in the Chess Olympiads of 1994, 1996 and 1998 and for Romania in the 2000 Chess Olympiad. In 2008 he tied for 1st–3rd with Zigurds Lanka and Ahmed Adly at Hamburg.

In 2020, 12 German national team members stated, they can not play while Rogozenco remains their trainer.

Books

References

External links

Dorian Rogozenko - Articles - New In Chess

1973 births
Living people
Chess players from Chișinău
Chess grandmasters
Romanian chess players
Chess Olympiad competitors
Chess writers